Herman Austin Johnson (March 4, 1953 – December 10, 2016), was a driver in the CART Indy Car series, born in Eau Claire, Wisconsin. He raced in seven seasons (1979–1985), with 35 career starts. He drove in the Indianapolis 500 in 1982 and 1984. He finished in the top ten eight times, with his best finish in 6th position in 1982 at Atlanta.

In 1976, Johnson won the SCCA National Championship at Road Atlanta and was the 1977 USAC Mini-Indy Champion. Johnson had two serious pit fires in 1981 roughly a month apart from each other. Johnson's father suffered a fatal heart attack, just days before the 1982 Indianapolis 500. Also during this race, Rick Mears bumped into the back of his car on a lap 183 pit stop. For his next race Johnson, who ran a business painting helmets, trimmed the back edge of his rear wing with the message "Rick...if you can read this, you're too close."

Johnson suffered a serious crash in practice for the 1986 Indianapolis 500. Johnson suffered injuries to his back and neck, and the crash effectively ended his Indy car driving career.

Johnson resided in Eau Claire, running a custom painting business, 'Just Herm Designs'. The shop has done work for several Indy 500 winners, IndyCar, and NHRA Champions, as well as amateur racers. The shop specializes in custom paint jobs for helmets, race cars, and motorcycles. Johnson also served as a performance driving instructor at Brainerd International Raceway in Brainerd, Minnesota.

On December 10, 2016, Johnson died from liver and renal failure.

Racing record

SCCA National Championship Runoffs

Complete USAC Mini-Indy Series results

Complete CART Indy Car Series results

Indianapolis 500 results

Notes 

1953 births
2016 deaths
Champ Car drivers
Indianapolis 500 drivers
Sportspeople from Eau Claire, Wisconsin
Racing drivers from Wisconsin
SCCA Formula Super Vee drivers
Formula Super Vee Champions
SCCA National Championship Runoffs winners
Deaths from kidney failure